The men's 50m Freestyle event at the 2006 Central American and Caribbean Games occurred on Wednesday, July 19, 2006, at the S.U. Pedro de Heredia Aquatic Complex in Cartagena, Colombia.

Records

Results

Final

Preliminaries

References

Men's 50 Free--Prelim results page from the official website of the 2006 Central American and Caribbean Games; retrieved 2009-06-29.
Men's 50 Free--Final results page from the official website of the 2006 Central American and Caribbean Games; retrieved 2009-06-29.

Freestyle, Men's 50m